Ken Crandall (born November 6, 1967) is an American football coach and former player.  He was most recently the head football coach for the Southwestern College Moundbuilders in Winfield, Kansas and was the 28th person to hold that position.  Prior to accepting this position, he was the head coach for nine years at the University of Minnesota Morris. Crandall had been a graduate assistant coach at Pittsburg State University during the Gorillas' national championship run in 1991. In addition, he was assistant coach at Norwich University and at the Maine Maritime Academy.  Crandall resigned the position at Southwestern on November 19, 2014.

Playing career
Crandall played college football at Fort Hays State University in Hays, Kansas.

Coaching career

Minnesota Morris
While at the University of Minnesota Morris, Crandall was named the 2006 UMAC North Division and Conference Coach of the Year. He led the Cougars to their first-ever Upper Midwest Athletic Conference championship with a thrilling 27–20 come from behind overtime win over Rockford College at the Hubert H. Humphrey Metrodome in Minneapolis.

Crandall established a record of 22 wins and 73 losses as a head coach in nine seasons but did build the program to a winning program.  In his last four seasons, Crandall produced a record of 21 wins and 20 losses. With 21 wins, Crandall is one of the “winningest” head coaches at UMM exceeded only by former head Cougar football coaches Al Molde (51–19–1) and Mike Simpson (29–13–1).

Southwestern
In 2007, his first year coaching at Southwestern, Crandall led the moundbuilders to a record of 4 wins and 5 losses (4–4 conference), ending the season #5 in the Kansas Collegiate Athletic Conference.  This showed an improvement from the 2 wins and 8 losses and finishing 9th in the conference the previous year.  He resigned from Southwestern after the conclusion of a 1–10 season (1–8 in conference play) which included a 27–6 homecoming victory over the then-ranked #3 Tabor Bluejays.

Awards
Crandall was awarded Upper Midwest Athletic Conference North Division Coach of the Year and Conference Coach of the Year for 2006.

Head coaching record

References

1967 births
Living people
Fort Hays State Tigers football players
Maine Maritime Mariners football coaches
Minnesota Morris Cougars football coaches
Norwich Cadets football coaches
Pittsburg State Gorillas football coaches
Southwestern Moundbuilders football coaches
Pittsburg State University alumni